A lever is a simple machine consisting of a beam or rigid rod pivoted at a fixed hinge, or fulcrum. A lever is a rigid body capable of rotating on a point on itself. On the basis of the locations of fulcrum, load and effort, the lever is divided into three types. It is one of the six simple machines identified by Renaissance scientists. A lever amplifies an input force to provide a greater output force, which is said to provide leverage, which is mechanical advantage gained in the system, equal to the ratio of the output force to the input force. As such, the lever is a mechanical advantage device, trading off force against movement.

Etymology 
This sprang from the stem of the verb lever, meaning "to raise". The word's primary origin is the Proto-Indo-European stem , meaning "light", "easy" or "nimble", among other things. The  PIE stem also gave rise to the English word "light".

History 
The earliest evidence of the lever mechanism dates back to the ancient Near East circa 5000 BC, when it was first used in a simple balance scale. In ancient Egypt circa 4400 BC, a foot pedal was used for the earliest horizontal frame loom. In Mesopotamia (modern Iraq) circa 3000 BC, the shadouf, a crane-like device that uses a lever mechanism, was invented. In ancient Egypt technology, workmen used the lever to move and uplift obelisks weighing more than 100 tons. This is evident from the recesses in the large blocks and the handling bosses which could not be used for any purpose other than for levers.

The earliest remaining writings regarding levers date from the 3rd century BC and were provided by the Greek mathematician Archimedes, who famously stated "Give me a lever long enough and a fulcrum on which to place it, and I shall move the world."

Force and levers 

A lever is a beam connected to ground by a hinge, or pivot, called a fulcrum. The ideal lever does not dissipate or store energy, which means there is no friction in the hinge or bending in the beam. In this case, the power into the lever equals the power out, and the ratio of output to input force is given by the ratio of the distances from the fulcrum to the points of application of these forces. This is known as the law of the lever.

The mechanical advantage of a lever can be determined by considering the balance of moments or torque, T, about the fulcrum. If the distance traveled is greater, then the output force is lessened.

where F1 is the input force to the lever and F2 is the output force. The distances a and b are the perpendicular distances between the forces and the fulcrum.

Since the moments of torque must be balanced, . So, .

The mechanical advantage of the lever is the ratio of output force to input force.

This relationship shows that the mechanical advantage can be computed from ratio of the distances from the fulcrum to where the input and output forces are applied to the lever, assuming no losses due to friction, flexibility or wear. This remains true even though the "horizontal" distance (perpendicular to the pull of gravity) of both a and b change (diminish) as the lever changes to any position away from the horizontal.

Classes of levers 

Levers are classified by the relative positions of the fulcrum, effort and resistance (or load). It is common to call the input force "effort" and the output force "load" or "resistance". This allows the identification of three classes of levers by the relative locations of the fulcrum, the resistance and the effort:
 Class I – Fulcrum is located between the effort and the resistance: The effort is applied on one side of the fulcrum and the resistance (or load) on the other side. For example, a seesaw, a crowbar or a pair of scissors, a balance scale, a claw hammer. With the fulcrum in the middle, the lever's mechanical advantage may be greater than, less than, or equal to 1.
 Class II – Resistance (or load) is located between the effort and the fulcrum: The effort is applied on one side of the resistance and the fulcrum is located on the other side, e.g. a wheelbarrow, a nutcracker, a bottle opener or the brake pedal of a car. Since the load arm is smaller than the effort arm, the lever's mechanical advantage is always greater than 1. It is also called a force multiplier lever.
 Class III – Effort is located between the resistance and the fulcrum: The resistance (or load) is applied on one side of the effort and the fulcrum is located on the other side, e.g. a pair of tweezers, a hammer, a pair of tongs, a fishing rod, or the mandible of a human skull. Since the effort arm is smaller than the load arm, the lever's mechanical advantage is always less than 1. It is also called a speed multiplier lever.

These cases are described by the mnemonic fre 123 where the f fulcrum is between r and e for the 1st class lever, the r resistance is between f and e for the 2nd class lever, and the e effort is between f and r for the 3rd class lever.

Compound lever 
 
A compound lever comprises several levers acting in series: the resistance from one lever in a system of levers acts as effort for the next, and thus the applied force is transferred from one lever to the next. Examples of compound levers include scales, nail clippers and piano keys.

The malleus, incus and stapes are small bones in the middle ear, connected as compound levers, that transfer sound waves from the eardrum to the oval window of the cochlea.

Law of the lever  

The lever is a movable bar that pivots on a fulcrum attached to a fixed point. The lever operates by applying forces at different distances from the fulcrum, or a pivot.

As the lever rotates around the fulcrum, points farther from this pivot move faster than points closer to the pivot. Therefore, a force applied to a point farther from the pivot must be less than the force located at a point closer in, because power is the product of force and velocity.

If a and b are distances from the fulcrum to points A and B and the force FA applied to A is the input and the force FB applied at B is the output, the ratio of the velocities of points A and B is given by a/b, so we have the ratio of the output force to the input force, or mechanical advantage, is given by:

This is the law of the lever, which was proven by Archimedes using geometric reasoning. It shows that if the distance a from the fulcrum to where the input force is applied (point A) is greater than the distance b from fulcrum to where the output force is applied (point B), then the lever amplifies the input force. On the other hand, if the distance a from the fulcrum to the input force is less than the distance b from the fulcrum to the output force, then the lever reduces the input force.

The use of velocity in the static analysis of a lever is an application of the principle of virtual work.

Virtual work and the law of the lever 
A lever is modeled as a rigid bar connected to a ground frame by a hinged joint called a fulcrum. The lever is operated by applying an input force FA at a point A located by the coordinate vector rA on the bar. The lever then exerts an output force FB at the point B located by rB. The rotation of the lever about the fulcrum P is defined by the rotation angle θ in radians.

Let the coordinate vector of the point P that defines the fulcrum be rP, and introduce the lengths

which are the distances from the fulcrum to the input point A and to the output point B, respectively.

Now introduce the unit vectors eA and eB from the fulcrum to the point A and B, so

The velocity of the points A and B are obtained as

where eA⊥ and eB⊥ are unit vectors perpendicular to eA and eB, respectively.

The angle θ is the generalized coordinate that defines the configuration of the lever, and the generalized force associated with this coordinate is given by

where FA and FB are components of the forces that are perpendicular to the radial segments PA and PB. The principle of virtual work states that at equilibrium the generalized force is zero, that is

Thus, the ratio of the output force FB to the input force FA is obtained as

which is the mechanical advantage of the lever.

This equation shows that if the distance a from the fulcrum to the point A where the input force is applied is greater than the distance b from fulcrum to the point B where the output force is applied, then the lever amplifies the input force. If the opposite is true that the distance from the fulcrum to the input point A is less than from the fulcrum to the output point B, then the lever reduces the magnitude of the input force.

See also 

 
 Balance lever coupling

References

External links 

Lever at Diracdelta science and engineering encyclopedia
 A Simple Lever by Stephen Wolfram, Wolfram Demonstrations Project.
 Levers: Simple Machines at EnchantedLearning.com

Mechanisms (engineering)
Simple machines
Ancient inventions
Egyptian inventions